Chungongtu(春宮圖,Spring palace illustration), also known as chungonghua(春宮畵), was a tradition of erotic art in china.

History
The first known record of the tradition dates back to 2nd century B.C. Chen ping of the Han Dynasty, and Guangchuanwang were said to have enjoyed drawing erotic art. The paintings were used as decorations of folding screens during the Tang dynasty. During the Yuan dynasty, the tradition had Mongolian influences. According to the research of the Dutch sinologist Robert van Gulik , in the " Book of Han ", "sitting in the painting house is for men and women to meet naked, buy wine and invite all fathers and sisters to drink, and make them look up at the painting." , is the erotic map in the future. Zhang Heng , a scientist and poet of the Eastern Han Dynasty, has a line in his poem "Song of the Same Voice(同声歌)": "clothes solve the golden powder royal, and the pictures are on the pillow; the plain girl is my teacher, and the posture is full of thousands of squares(衣解金粉御，列图陈枕张；素女为我师，仪态盈万方)", [2] which is used as a model The picture is a picture of the erotic palace, and "Plain girl" refers to the " Su Nü Jing " in the room.

The habit of viewing erotic paintings with young ladies is also described in Chinese classical literature. Bai Xingjian, a poet of the Tang Dynasty, mentioned the picture album of " Su Nu Jing" in " Tiandi yinyang jiaohuan dalefu ". Wei Yangsheng in Li Yu's " The Carnal Prayer Mat " in the Qing Dynasty also depicts the practice saying  "Go to a calligraphy and painting shop to buy an exquisite and exquisite erotic booklet, which was written by Zhao Ziang, a scholar of this dynasty . Thirty-six sets, the thirty-six palaces in Tang poems all mean spring scenery, take it and put it in the boudoir, so it’s better for Miss Yuxiang to read it together." It can be seen that in ancient China, erotic paintings were mainly used as a medium for sex education .

20th century scholar Zheng Zhenduo mentioned in "Talking about Jin Ping Mei Ci Hua(谈金瓶梅词话)" that "obscene lyrics and music" and chungonghua are most hidden in the emperor's harem. The erotic paintings of the Han and Tang Dynasties no longer exist and are now lost in history. The "Secret Plays at Spring Night(春宵秘戏图)" that was popular in the Song Dynasty, and the thirty-six erotic paintings painted by the painter Zhao Mengfu in the Yuan Dynasty and another 12 examples also do not exist in modern times. Ming dynasty painter Qiu Ying(仇英) was a notable painter in the genre.The erotic art of China reached its popular peak during the latter part of the Ming Dynasty.

See also
Chunhwa
Shunga

References

Erotic art
Sexuality in China
Cultural history of China